Streptomyces armeniacus is a bacterium species from the genus Streptomyces which has isolated from soil. Streptomyces armeniacus produces streptopyrrole.

See also 
 List of Streptomyces species

References

Further reading

External links
Type strain of Streptomyces armeniacus at BacDive -  the Bacterial Diversity Metadatabase

armeniacus
Bacteria described in 1981